The Whitby Mall Shopping Centre is a shopping mall located in Whitby, Ontario, Canada.

History
The Whitby Mall is composed of a ground floor of enclosed retail space and an upper floor of commercial office space. It opened in 1970, with roughly twenty stores and Woolco and Miracle Food Mart serving as anchor tenants. An addition began construction in 1980 and was completed by 1983; the expansion added an additional fifty stores and Lang Tower, a wing of the mall that houses its commercial office space.

By 2000, anchor tenant Walmart had been replaced with a Sobeys that lacks direct access to the mall, and commercial office tenants began to close or relocate, leading to a decline in customers and tenancy at Whitby Mall. Though the mall experienced an upswing in store occupancy by the end of the decade following the opening of a ServiceOntario location, by 2017 it was cited by the Toronto Star as a mall "struggling to survive" amid the retail apocalypse of the 2010s.

In 2016, the Whitby Mall was acquired by the real estate firm First Capital. The firm indicated in 2017 that it has long-term plans to redevelop Whitby Mall into a mixed-use development, similarly to its previous conversion of Hazelton Lanes to Yorkville Village in 2016.

Notable incidents
In 2016, the McDonald's location at the Whitby Mall received an unannounced visit from Canadian Prime Minister Justin Trudeau, which was covered by the CBC. On July 3, 2019, a shooting occurred during a dispute in the Whitby Mall's parking lot. The two suspects in the incident were arrested in Owen Sound on July 6, 2019 on multiple firearms-related charges.

Anchors

Current
 Lastman's Bad Boy
 Sobeys
 Talize

Former
 Miracle Food Mart
 Staples (replaced by Talize)
 Walmart (replaced by Sobeys)
 Woolco (replaced by Walmart)

Transportation access
Whitby Mall is located in Whitby, Ontario, and is accessed by Dundas Street East to the north, Thickson Road South to the west, and Nichol Avenue to the south. There is controlled access to the mall with a traffic light at Thickson Road South.

References 

Shopping malls in Ontario
Shopping malls established in 1970
Buildings and structures in Whitby, Ontario
1970 establishments in Ontario